Francesco Antonio Santori (Arbërisht: Françesk Anton Santori or Ndon Santori; September 16, 1819 – September 7, 1894) was an Italian writer, poet and playwright of Arbëreshë descent. His play Emira is considered to be the first original Albanian drama ever written. The main character is a young and innocent girl who becomes a victim. Albanian literature of that time does not present many female characters like Ermira.

Life 
Santori was born on September 16, 1819 in Santa Caterina Albanese, an Arbëreshë town in the province of Cosenza, modern southern Italy. In 1835 at the age of sixteen he decided to become a priest and started his training for priesthood. In 1843 he entered the Franciscan monastery of the Reformed Order in San Marco Argentano. In 1858 he unsuccessfully tried to found a monastery in Lattarico, and in 1860 he abandoned monastic life.

He continued living in Santa Caterina Albanese, where he worked as a teacher and a vendor of a spinning jenny he had constructed. In 1885 he was assigned as priest in San Giacomo di Cerzeto, a village of Cerzeto where he worked until his death on September 7, 1894.

Work 
During his life Santori wrote poetry, novels, plays and short stories. He also adapted 112 of Aesop's Fables and wrote an Albanian grammar book. Santori wrote and finished his first poetry, titled Canzoniere Albanese in the 1830s and published it in 1846. Canzoniere Albanese is a long lyric poem dedicated to love and nature. The poem was influenced by Girolamo de Rada's Song of Milosao. In 1848 he composed a hymn in Albanian titled Valle haresë madhe, published on February 23, 1848 in De Rada's journal L'Albanese d'Italia.

In 1848 his bilingual political poem Il prigionero politico written in Albanian and Italian was published in Naples. The poem recounts the changes of the life of a persecuted family during the revolutions of 1848 in the Italian states. During his years in the monastery of the Reformed Order in Cerzeto he wrote two religious works. The first work is a religious verse titled Rozhaari i S. Myriis Virgkiyry (written in Albanian and published in 1849 in Cosenza. The second one is a 230-page collection of prayers, religious texts and translations of religious songs titled Kryshten i shyityruory published in 1855 in Naples. The Sanctified Christian contains parts of Cuneus Prophetarum published in 1685 and written by Pjetër Bogdani, one of the most important writers of early Albanian literature. Santori included excerpts of Cuneus Prophetarum in his book to symbolize the continuity of Albanian religious literature.

Santori wrote many plays, including melodramatic comedies and tragedies some of which remain incomplete. His plays include Jeroboam, a tragedy of biblical content and Alessio Dukagino a melodrama written between 1855 and 1860, recounting the life of Lekë Dukagjini, an Albanian prince who fought against the Ottoman Empire. His best-known play, Emira, titled after the name of its central figure, is considered to be the first original Albanian drama ever written. The drama recounts the adventures of Emira, Kalina, Albenci, and Mirjani during a social revolt in Calabria, and the life in the Arbëreshë communities. Some parts of the play were published originally in the journal Fjamuri Arbërit and later in Jeronim de Rada's Albanian Anthology. In modern years, 1,845 lines of satirical verse written by Santori have been found.

Most of Santori's novels and short stories were published after his death in 1894. His novels include Sofia Kominiate, an unfinished novel written in two versions. The first version contains 282 pages and is written in Albanian, while the second version, written in Italian, contains 714 pages. No copies have survived from his novel Bija e mallkuar written in Albanian. He also wrote the novel Il soldato albanese in Italian. Santori wrote many short stories known by the names of their central figures. His short stories written in Albanian include: Brisandi Lletixja e Ulladheni, Emilja, Fëmija Pushtjerote, Filaredo, Gnidhja e Kusari, Kolluqi e Sorofina, Miloshini, Neomenia, Panaini e Dellja, Rosarja, and Virgjinia.

Influences and style 
Santori's works are written in an archaic form of Tosk Albanian and are generally more accessible to the audience despite of his orthographic style. In his works he uses his own spelling system without any phonetic accuracy. Common themes in Santori's works include rural life, the period of the League of Lezhë of Albanian history and the customs of Arbëreshë communities. His political poems contain moralistic motifs describing the central ideas and feelings of the characters of each poem. In several of his poems like Dance of great joy Santori describes folkloric elements of Albanian culture like folk songs and dances.

See also 
Arbëreshë
Albanian literature
Albanian National Awakening
Girolamo de Rada

Sources 

1819 births
1894 deaths
Activists of the Albanian National Awakening
Arbëreshë people
19th-century Albanian poets
19th-century Italian poets
People from the Province of Cosenza
19th-century Albanian writers
Albanian male poets
Italian male poets
Albanian-language poets
Albanian-language writers
Albanian male short story writers
Albanian short story writers
Italian male short story writers
Albanian novelists
19th-century Italian novelists
Albanian dramatists and playwrights
Italian male dramatists and playwrights
19th-century Italian short story writers
19th-century Italian dramatists and playwrights
19th-century Italian male writers